The twentieth season of the American animated television series The Simpsons aired on Fox from September 28, 2008, to May 17, 2009. With this season, the show tied Gunsmoke as the longest-running American primetime television series in terms of total number of seasons. The season was released on Blu-ray on January 12, 2010, making this the first season to be released on Blu-ray as well as the only one to contain both 16:9 widescreen and high-definition episodes. It was released on DVD in Region 1 on January 12, 2010, and in Region 4 on January 20, 2010. The season was only released on DVD in Region 2 on September 17, 2010, in a few areas.

Production
It contained nine holdover episodes from season 19’s KABF production line.

Production on the season was delayed because of contract negotiations with the six main voice actors. The dispute was resolved, and the actors' salary was raised to US$400,000 per episode. The delay in production caused the planned 22 episodes to be shortened to 20. In addition, voice actor Dan Castellaneta was credited as a consulting producer for the first time. The main cast consisted of Castellaneta, Julie Kavner, Nancy Cartwright, Yeardley Smith, Hank Azaria, and Harry Shearer. The recurring cast consisted of Marcia Wallace, Pamela Hayden, Tress MacNeille, Russi Taylor, and Karl Wiedergott.

The Simpsons began high-definition production in season 20. The first episode in HD, "Take My Life, Please", aired on February 15, 2009. "Take My Life, Please" is also the first to feature the new opening sequence.

Also, more episodes were given the TV-14 rating than any previous season. The episodes that were given this rating were "Sex, Pies and Idiot Scrapes", "Treehouse of Horror XIX", "Gone Maggie Gone", "No Loan Again, Naturally", "Dangerous Curves", "Wedding For Disaster", and "Four Great Women and a Manicure".

20th anniversary
In 2009, to celebrate the 20th anniversary of the premiere of The Simpsons, Fox announced that a year-long celebration of the show titled "Best. 20 Years. Ever." would run from January 14, 2009 to January 14, 2010. Several contests were run, including the "Unleash Your Yellow" contest in which entrants designed a poster for the show and "Best. Couch Gag. Ever." where fans created their own live-action couch gag video.

As part of the celebration, the Irish-themed episode "In the Name of the Grandfather" premiered on Sky1 in the United Kingdom and Ireland on March 17, 2009. It was the first-ever episode of the show to air in Europe before being seen in the United States. The American debut of the episode was on March 22.

Reception

Critical reception
Robert Canning of IGN gave the season a 7.9 out of 10 improving 1.3 from the past season. He gave it a positive review saying that it was "Good" and that "With at least two more years of The Simpsons guaranteed, this unexpected but very welcome resurgence has come at a perfect time. If they can keep the momentum moving, the series is primed to once again approach perfection and go out at the top of its game."

Awards

Episodes from the twentieth season received five Primetime Emmy Award nominations. "Gone Maggie Gone" was nominated for Outstanding Animated Program (For Programming less than One Hour) and Outstanding Music Composition for a Series. Dan Castellaneta won the Outstanding Voice-Over Performance Emmy for voicing Homer in the episode "Father Knows Worst"; Hank Azaria and Harry Shearer were also nominated for the episodes "Eeny Teeny Maya Moe" and "The Burns and the Bees", respectively. The winners were announced on September 12, 2009. The Simpsons was the only series to be nominated in the Animation category at the Writers Guild of America Awards in 2010. The nominees were: Stephanie Gillis for "The Burns and the Bees", John Frink for "Eeny Teeny Maya, Moe", Billy Kimball & Ian Maxtone-Graham for Gone Maggie Gone", Don Payne for "Take My Life, Please", and Joel H. Cohen for "Wedding for Disaster". The award was won by Joel H. Cohen.

Nielsen ratings
The season ranked 77th in ratings with an average of 6.93 million viewers and an 18/49 rating of 3.4/9 and the rerun timeslot ranking 113th. The most viewed episode was "Treehouse of Horror XIX", with 12.48 million watching it and a 4.9 Nielsen rating. The least viewed episode was "Four Great Women and a Manicure" which is the second-least-viewed episode of the series, after Season 21's "Million Dollar Maybe".

Episodes

Blu-ray and DVD release
The DVD and Blu-ray boxset for season twenty was released by 20th Century Fox Home Entertainment in the United States and Canada on January 12, 2010, eight months after it had completed broadcast on television. As well as every episode from the season, the Blu-ray and DVD releases feature hand-drawn menus by Matt Groening.

References

Bibliography

External links
Season 20 at The Simpsons.com

Simpsons season 20
2008 American television seasons
2009 American television seasons